Adrián Leško (born 24 July 1995), is a Slovak professional footballer who plays for Partizán Bardejov as a midfielder.

Honours
Leško won the 2014–15 DOXXbet liga with the MFK Zemplín Michalovce.

Club career
Leško was born in Bardejov in Slovakia. He made his senior debut for MFK Zemplín Michalovce at the age of 16, eleven months and 13 days, on 23 May 2012 against FK Bodva Moldava nad Bodvou, entering in as a substitute in place of Jaroslav Dargaj. He made his professional Fortuna Liga debut for MFK Zemplín Michalovce against FK AS Trenčín on 18 July 2015.

References

External links
 MFK Zemplín Michalovce official profile
 Futbalnet profile
 Eurofotbal profile
 

1995 births
Living people
Slovak footballers
Association football midfielders
MFK Zemplín Michalovce players
FC Lokomotíva Košice players
ŠK Odeva Lipany players
1. FC Tatran Prešov players
Partizán Bardejov players
FK Slavoj Trebišov players
MŠK Tesla Stropkov players
People from Bardejov
Sportspeople from the Prešov Region